Gerry L. Alexander  (b. 1936) is the former Chief Justice of the Supreme Court of the U.S. state of Washington.  He was elected to the court in 1994 and re-elected in 2000.  Following this election, his colleagues elected him to a four-year term as chief justice.  He was re-elected as chief justice in 2004 and re-elected to the court in 2006.  Due to the court's age limit of 75, Alexander was unable to complete his final six-year term. He stepped down as Chief Justice at the beginning of 2010 and retired from the Court in December 2011.

Early life and education

Alexander was born in 1936 in Aberdeen, Washington. He attended Olympia High School in Olympia, Washington, and graduated from the University of Washington with a BA in History in 1958. While a student at UW, he was a member of the Gamma Chi Chapter of the Sigma Nu fraternity.  In 1964, Alexander received his JD from the University of Washington Law School.

References

1936 births
Living people
People from Aberdeen, Washington
Chief Justices of the Washington Supreme Court
University of Washington School of Law alumni